The 1949–50 Montreal Canadiens season was the 41st season in club history. The team placed second in the regular season to qualify for the playoffs. The Canadiens lost in the semi-finals against New York Rangers four games to one.

Regular season

Final standings

Record vs. opponents

Schedule and results

Playoffs

Semi-finals

Player statistics

Regular season
Scoring

Goaltending

Playoffs
Scoring

Goaltending

Awards and records
 Vezina Trophy: Bill Durnan

Transactions

See also
 1949–50 NHL season

References
Canadiens on Hockey Database
Canadiens on NHL Reference

Montreal Canadiens seasons
Montreal
Montreal